Bañados de Carrasco is a barrio (neighbourhood or district) of Montevideo, Uruguay.

Location
Bañados de Carrasco borders Las Canteras to the southwest, Flor de Maroñas and Jardines del Hipódromo to the west, Punta de Rieles - Bella Italia to the northwest, Villa García - Manga Rural to the north, the Canelones Department to the east, and Carrasco Norte to the south.

See also 
Barrios of Montevideo

External links 
 Museo y Parque Fernando García

Barrios of Montevideo